The 1990 Welwyn Hatfield District Council election took place on 3 May 1990 to elect members of Welwyn Hatfield District Council in England. This was on the same day as other local elections.

Summary

Election results

References

Welwyn Hatfield
Welwyn Hatfield Borough Council elections
1990s in Hertfordshire